In the final, Elena Likhovtseva and Anastasia Myskina defeated Neha Uberoi and Shikha Uberoi 6–1, 6–0 to win the first edition of this tournament.

Seeds

Results

Draw

References

External links
Doubles Draw

2005 WTA Tour
Sunfeast Open